Catterall is a civil parish in the Wyre district of Lancashire, England.  It contains eight listed buildings that are recorded in the National Heritage List for England.  All the listed buildings are designated at Grade II, the lowest of the three grades, which is applied to "buildings of national importance and special interest".  The parish includes the village of Catterall and the surrounding countryside.  The Lancaster Canal and the River Calder run through the parish, and the listed buildings associated with these are bridges and an aqueduct.  The other listed buildings are two medieval cross bases, a farmhouse with an associated barn, and a milestone.


Buildings

References

Citations

Sources

Lists of listed buildings in Lancashire
Buildings and structures in the Borough of Wyre